Parizaad (پری زاد)is an Urdu-language novel by Pakistani author Hashim Nadeem. The novel revolves around the titular protagonist who is always mocked due to his personality and name.

Adaptation 
The novel was adapted into a television series of the same name directed by Shahzad Kashmiri, and first aired on Hum TV in July 2021. Ahmed Ali Akbar played the titular character in the series.

References 

2014 novels
Urdu-language novels